The Conspiracy may refer to:

Literature
 The Conspiracy (play), a 1796 work by Robert Jephson
 The Conspiracy (Animorphs), a 1999 novel by K. A. Applegate

Film
 The Conspiracy (1916 film), a film directed by Henry MacRae, starring Harry Carey
 The Conspiracy (2012 film), a film directed by Christopher MacBride, starring Aaron Poole and James Gilbert
 XIII: The Conspiracy, a 2008 film directed by Duane Clark, starring Val Kilmer and Stephen Dorff